Rafael Thyere de Albuquerque Marques (born 27 March 1993), known as Rafael Thyere, is a Brazilian professional footballer who plays as a central defender for Sport Recife.

Career
In August 2014, with the goal of reducing the cast and giving experience to young prospects, Rafael Thyere was loaned from Grêmio to Boa Esporte until the end of the season. Just a month later, in September 2014, Thyere broke his loan contract with Boa Esporte without having played any competitive matches, and signed a new loan agreement until the end of the year, this time with Atlético Goianiense, in search of more opportunities to play.

Career statistics

Honours
Grêmio
Copa do Brasil: 2016
Copa Libertadores: 2017

References

External links

1993 births
Living people
People from João Pessoa, Paraíba
Brazilian footballers
Association football defenders
Campeonato Brasileiro Série A players
Grêmio Foot-Ball Porto Alegrense players
Boa Esporte Clube players
Atlético Clube Goianiense players
Associação Chapecoense de Futebol players
Sport Club do Recife players
Sportspeople from Paraíba